Tongland is a small village about  north of Kirkcudbright, in the historic county of Kirkcudbrightshire in Dumfries and Galloway, Scotland. It lies on the west bank of the Dee near its confluence with the Tarff Water.

History
  
Tongland Abbey, a medieval Premonstratensian monastic community, existed here during the Middle Ages. The remains of Tongland Abbey are now within the churchyard just south of the main road. Tongland Church built in 1813, is now disused and in a state of ruin, although the graveyard is still in use. 

The Dee is crossed shortly downriver by Tongland Bridge, a stone arch bridge constructed in 1806 by civil engineer  Thomas Telford. Telford was assisted in the Works by resident civil engineer, A Blane.

Since the 1930s, Tongland has been the site of a hydro-electric power station, part of the Galloway Hydro Electric Scheme.  The station used to be open to visitors during the summer months, since 2007 this has no longer been the case.  Slightly earlier, between 1921 and 1922 'Galloway' cars were made in Tongland in a First World War factory staffed mainly by female apprentice engineers. The Galloway Engineering Company factory was originally completed in 1917 and was powered by its own hydro-electric scheme on the Dee.

Since 2004, there have been several construction projects, with the site of a former garage now home to three new houses. There are also several more houses being constructed. In 2006, street lights were installed along the A711 which passes through the village.

Notable people
Thomas Brown Tongland minister and Free Church moderator.
Joe Dobson, co-founder of Interflora was born in Tongland in 1875.
Campbell Cowan Edgar, Egyptologist and Secretary-General of the Egyptian Museum in Cairo, was born in Tongland in 1870

See also
List of listed buildings in Tongland, Dumfries and Galloway

References

Villages in Dumfries and Galloway
Kirkcudbrightshire
Parishes in Dumfries and Galloway